The  is a railway keiretsu whose parent company is the Tokyu Corporation railway company, which links Tokyo and its suburbs. Many companies in the group are designed to enhance the value of the Tokyu rail network. In addition to the railroad system, the group includes other companies in transportation, real-estate, retail, leisure, and cultural endeavors. Here is a partial list of companies in the Tokyu Group.

Transportation
 Tokyu Railways, a major private railway operator in the Greater Tokyo Area
 Izukyū Corporation, a railway in Shizuoka Prefecture
 Ueda Kotsū (Holding company of Ueda Electric Railway etc.), in Nagano Prefecture
 Tokyu Bus
 Tokyu Transsés in Shibuya
 Tokyu Shachi Bus, a charter bus service in the greater Nagoya metro area
 Jōtetsu (in Sapporo, Hokkaido)
 Sōya Bus (in Wakkanai, Hokkaido)
 Hokkaido Kitami Bus (in Kitami, Hokkaido)
 Abashiri Kōtsū (in Abashiri District, Hokkaido)
 Shari Bus (in Shari, Shari District)

Real estate
Tokyu Land
Tokyu Livable
Tokyu Community

Retail
Tokyu Department Store
Tokyu Stores
Tokyu Hands (acquired by Cainz in 2022)
Tokyu Commercial Development
SHIBUYA109 Entertainment Corporation

Leisure
Tokyu Recreation
Tokyu Agency
Tokyu Hotels
Tokyu Resort Corporation
Pan Pacific Hotels, sold to UOL Group of Singapore in 2007.
Mauna Lani Bay Resort (sold in 2017)

Construction and other
Tokyu Corporation
Tokyu Construction
Tokyu Security
Seiki Tokyu Kogyou Co.Ltd
Toei Company (4.06%)
Shizuoka Railway (3.0%)
:ja:大東急
Keikyu (It is taken a 1.0% stake by Tokyu Group)
Odakyu (It is taken a 0.4% stake by Tokyu Group)
Keio Corporation (It is taken a 0.7% stake by Tokyu Group)
Kokusai Kogyo (It is a bus company)
Sotetsu (Tokyu Meguro Line will have commenced interconnecting with railway lines of Sotetsu since 2022. Tokyu takes a small stake in Sotetsu)
Japan Airlines
Japan Air System which was a wholly owned subsidiary was merged into Japan Airlines. So, Tokyu made a 4% investment in Japan Airlines. Now, Tokyu acquires a 0.11% stake in Japan Airlines.
Tobu Railway (It is made a small investment by Tokyu Group)
Seibu Holdings (It is made a small investment by Tokyu Group)
Nangoku Kotsu
Nangokoku Kotsu makes a 0.001% investment in Tokyu Corporation, and the companies' vehicles resemble Tokyu Buses' in appearance.

Kanto Bus
Kanto Bus makes a 0.0001% investment in Tokyu Corporation

Culture
Gotoh Educational Corporation (which manages Tokyo City University, and affiliated schools including Tokyo City University Junior and Senior High School)
Asia Academy (affiliated with Asia University)
Tokyu Bunkamura (operators of the Bunkamura theater-concert hall-cinema complex)
Gotoh Museum, named for the founder of the railroad, the entrepreneur Keita Gotō

Telecommunications
 Its Communications (itscom), a cable TV and internet service company.

See also
The following companies used to be affiliated companies of Tokyu Group. 
Echigo Kotsu
Kusakaru Ueda Holdings

References

External links

Tokyu Group

 
Keiretsu
Conglomerate companies of Japan
Companies based in Tokyo